The civil war of 1848-1849 was an armed conflict in Venezuela that pitted the conservatives led by José Antonio Páez against the newly established liberal government of José Tadeo Monagas.

Background 
The antecedents of the conflict go back to the Peasant Insurrection of 1846. After the defeat of this popular movement, led by the Liberal Party, José Tadeo Monagas was chosen as presidential candidate by the conservative party as a figure who could achieve reconciliation.

Monagas triumphed in the election and assumed the presidency of the republic. Páez and the conservatives tried to control him, but he soon distanced himself from the conservatives and approached the liberals. The congress (dominated by the conservative party) tried to prosecute Monagas on charges of constitutional violations but this attempt failed after the congress was stormed by a liberal mob and silenced.

Conflict 
Paez took up arms on 4 February 1848 in Calabozo, with a proclamation where he appointed himself chief of operations of the armies to restore constitutional order, then moved to Apure, where he took San Fernando de Apure. Monagas highlighted General Santiago Mariño against him, who sent a column against Páez and defeated him on 10 March at the Battle of Los Araguatos. After this Páez left the country.

Meanwhile, the fighting was concentrated in the west of the country, in Coro and Zulia. Páez invaded from La Vela de Coro in 1849 and penetrated to Cojedes but when his rearguard was defeated in Casupo, he capitulated in Macapo Abajo before General .

With the capture of the main leader of the conservative rebellion, the movement lost strength and ended almost entirely with the taking of Maracaibo by liberal troops. With the defeat of the conservative reaction, the First Liberal Autocracy was consolidated, which would last until the Revolution of 1859.

Naval blockade of Maracaibo 
On 17 August 1848, the schooners "Constitución" and "Restauración" appeared before Carúpano, commanded by Captain José Celis and loyal to the Páez conservative rebellion. After unsuccessfully attacking the plaza, the two conservative schooners withdrew, and then sailed to Maracaibo, where a rebel squadron began to gather. Knowing this, the government ordered the concentration of naval forces in La Guaira, in order to organize a naval expedition against the conservative forces concentrated in Maracaibo.

In October 1848, the National Squadron was organized in Puerto Cabello to confront the revolutionaries. Then they sailed to Capan (Edo. Falcón), where the preparation of the boats was completed. General Monagas appointed General Justo Briceño as Head of Sea and Land Operations for the actions in Maracaibo. The government squadron consisted of two divisions, one under the command of the CN José María García and the other under the command of the TN Antonio Gregorio Lion. In total it had the brigs “Manzanares”, “Congreso” and “Presidente”, the brigs- schooners “Ávila” and “Diana”, the schooners “Independencia”, “Estrella”, “Forzosa”, Fama, Democracia, “Eclipse”, “Intrépida” and “Boliviana”, and the war steamer “Libertador”. On 6 October they sailed towards the entrance of Lake Maracaibo. The next day they recognized the bar and on the 8th they proceeded to climb it. Six revolutionary ships tried to cut them off, but were dispersed and took refuge under the fire of Castillo San Carlos. Once the Barra de Maracaibo was occupied, the naval forces of the Government demanded the surrender of the revolutionaries. They requested a period of 48 hours, which they used to prepare to fight.

At dawn on 13 October, the conservatives attacked the constitutional forces with 17 ships, but were defeated after two hours of fierce combat, in which they lost three ships, and had disperse at the end. After this combat, the revolutionaries gathered at the mouth of the Zulia River on 23 December, where they were joined by ground forces from San Carlos Castle, protecting themselves with the ships that still remained, among them the steamer "General Jackson", armed with a 24-pounder cannon, another 8-pounder and another 4-pounder.

General 
 attacked the rebels in this position on December 31, soundly defeating them, and captured the steamer, seven feluccas, and 30 dugouts. After this combat, the National Squadron began to have the steamers "Libertador", "Tritón" and "General Jackson", in addition to the schooner "Intrepida".

See also 

 Barquisimeto rebellion

Bibliography 

 Esteves González, Edgar (2006). Las Guerras de Los Caudillos. Caracas: El Nacional. .
 Dixon, Jeffrey S. & Meredith Reid Sarkees (2015). A Guide to Intra-state Wars: An Examination of Civil, Regional, and Intercommunal Wars, 1816–2014. CQ Press. .

References 

Wars involving Venezuela
1840s in Venezuela
1849 in Venezuela